The Pack River is a medium-sized river located in Northern Idaho. The river flows into Lake Pend Oreille and is part of the Columbia River watershed via the Pend Oreille River.

Course
Its headwaters originate in the Selkirk Mountains, and flow in a southerly direction to the river's mouth at the northern tip of Lake Pend Oreille.  It is the second largest tributary to the lake, after the Clark Fork River.

Watershed
The upper portion of the watershed is mostly forested, and managed by the U.S. Forest Service. The lower watershed is under mixed public and private ownership, and supports a variety of uses.

Peak river flows for a 100-year event exceed . Pack River and its tributaries often experience more than one run-off event per year. Mid-winter rain-on-snow events can result in rapid snow melt, and in some years the peak flow from tributary watersheds occurs during these events. Following the  Sundance wildfire in 1967, removal of the forest canopy was hypothesized to have produced an increase in annual stream flow from the basin and an advance of the peak flows by virtue of decreased transpiration losses and earlier snowmelt runoff generation.

Tributaries
The Pack River has about 34 tributaries. Grouse Creek is the biggest, followed by Rapid Lightning Creek, Jeru Creek, and Hellroaring Creek. These along with the West Branch of the Pack River are the crucial streams forming the River's size.

Geology
The underlying geology in the Pack River watershed is largely granitic, which decomposes into fine particles.  Glaciation in the Pack River valley formed ice dams upstream of the confluence of many tributaries, resulting in large deposits of glacial till.  Fine sandy sediments deposited in the dammed water are known as glacial fluvial deposits. These sandy areas today appear on mountain side slopes, forming very erosive soils.

Because of the high potential for sediment delivery to the Pack River, land use practices such as road building, timber harvesting, grazing, agriculture, and residential development must be carefully managed.  Any loss of riparian vegetation and associated root masses can result in delivery of fine sediment to the stream channel.

Ecology
The Pack River watershed is home to a number of species protected by the Endangered Species Act.  Bull trout, a threatened species, hatch in the upper river, and migrate the length of the river to grow upwards of 30 inches in Lake Pend Oreille before returning as adults to spawn again in the upper river.  Terrestrial species found here include the endangered woodland caribou and grey wolf, and threatened species grizzly bear, Canada lynx, and bald eagle.  Idaho wildlife species of special concern supported by the Pack River watershed include the wolverine, fisher, northern goshawk, and the white-winged crossbill.

Other relatively abundant wildlife species that rely on this watershed include westslope cutthroat and brook trout, kokanee salmon, white-tailed deer, mule deer, moose, elk, black bear, mountain lion, mountain goat, river otter, mink, muskrat, beaver, osprey, peregrine falcon, turtles, a variety of hawks and owls, migratory songbirds and waterfowl, several species of game birds, and many other wetland species.

The Pack River Flats is home to a wide variety of wildlife. Canada geese nest on the platforms in the marsh. Geese, swans, and ducks congregate here in spring and fall during their migration. This area also provides public access to wildlife viewing, hunting, and fishing. The Pack River Flats is important ecologically to moose, deer, elk, and waterfowl. Although there is currently no active eagle nesting here, eagles come to the area in the winter to feed on carrion and waterfowl. Before completion of Albeni Falls Dam on the Pend Oreille River in 1952, the lake level dropped after the spring runoff. Pack River Flats was a natural meadow then, and archaeological evidence suggests that it was historically an important site for Native Americans.

Recreation
The Pack River supports numerous recreational pursuits.  Fishing, kayaking, canoeing, and river floating are common activities.  To protect the river environment and reduce conflicts with other recreationists, motorized watercraft are prohibited above the Highway 200 bridge.  In the watershed, hiking, hunting, snowmobiling, rock climbing, and wildlife viewing opportunities abound.

The Pack River Watershed Council was formed in 2001 to coordinate watershed restoration projects along the river.

References

External links
 Tri-State Water Quality Council Citizens, business, industry, tribes, government and environmental groups combined to oversee the Clark Fork-Pend Oreille river system

Rivers of Idaho
Rivers of Bonner County, Idaho